This is a list of traditional Japanese games. Some of them are localized.

Games

Children's games
 Beigoma
 Bīdama
 Daruma-san
 Hide-and-seek
 Kemari
 Kendama
 Ken-ken-pa (Hopscotch)
 Menko
 Nawatobi (Jump rope)
 Ohajiki
 Onigokko
 Oshikura Manju
 Otedama

Board games
 Go - originates in China, important rules change (free opening) in Japan
 Renju
 Shogi
 Sugoroku
 Ninuki-renju

Card games
 Buta no shippo
 Daifugō (another name: Daihinmin)
 Hanafuda
 Karuta
 Oicho-Kabu
 Two-ten-jack (Tsū-ten-jakku) - a Japanese trick-taking card game.
 Uta-garuta - a kind of karuta (another name: Hyakunin Isshu)

Tile games
 Japanese Mahjong - Japanese mahjong, also called rīchi mahjong
Sudoku

Dice games
 Cho-han bakuchi - a gambling game
 Kitsune bakuchi

Word games
Dajare
Henohenomoheji
Kaibun
Shiritori
Uta-garuta

See also
Japanese role-playing game
Video game

 
Japan, trad
Games, trad
Games, trad